Blair Entertainment (formerly Rhodes Productions) is a television production/distribution company founded by Jack E. Rhodes, operated from 1975 until 1992.

History

Rhodes Productions
Rhodes Productions was originally formed in 1970 by Jack E. Rhodes as a subsidiary of Taft Broadcasting Company in New York City, to distribute Hanna-Barbera cartoons. In 1971, Rhodes expanded by distributing the syndicated version of the game show Hollywood Squares. Also at the same time, the company's headquarters was moved from New York City to Los Angeles.

In 1975, the original Rhodes Productions was renamed by Taft to Taft H-B Program Sales, and Jack E. Rhodes has moved to Filmways to serve as chief of the domestic syndication arm launch Rhodes Production Company. Rhodes took the nighttime Hollywood Squares with them, and also launched the nighttime version of the game show High Rollers. Under the Filmways regime, Rhodes Productions also launched the soap opera spoof for late night viewing, Mary Hartman, Mary Hartman, which is produced by Norman Lear and his T.A.T. Communications Company in 1976. In 1977, Rhodes Productions debuted its breakout property Second City Television (SCTV), which was originated in Canada.

In 1978, Rhodes Productions was split off from Filmways, and began operating as an independent production company and syndicator. Rhodes opted to keep Second City Television and Disco Break, while Filmways was forming the new syndication company Filmways Enterprises. In 1980, Rhodes purchased the syndication rights of Let's Make a Deal, the 1980 revival that was originated in Canada. This was followed up in 1981 by another acquisition of a Canadian game show Pitfall.

Blair Entertainment
John Blair & Company through Blair Television acquired Rhodes Productions in 1983, and renamed it into Blair Entertainment. Blair had retained distribution rights of several shows like The Cisco Kid and SCTV, as well as a revival of Divorce Court. In 1985, Blair Entertainment had introduced the new game show Break the Bank in partnership with broadcasting groups Storer Communications and Hubbard Broadcasting. This was followed in 1986 by another game show property Strike It Rich. In 1986, they also expanded their production activities with launches of several TV series.

Divorce Court has been highly profitable, among other hit syndicated series in Blair's lineup. In 1990, Blair Entertainment, in collaboration with RHI Entertainment and advertising sales agent Action Media Group launched a new drama Dracula. It also signed a new reality program Detectives in White to cable. In 1991, Blair Entertainment debuted a new program in collaboration with GRB Entertainment and All American Television, Stuntmasters. In 1992, Blair Entertainment has shut down its operations. and their program library was acquired shortly thereafter by All American.

List of Syndicated Programs
This is a list of television programs that were syndicated by Blair Entertainment:

 The Beachcombers (1972)
 Break the Bank (1985)
 The Cisco Kid (1950)
 Death Valley Days (1952)
 Divorce Court (1984)
 Dracula: The Series (1990)
 Let's Make a Deal (1980)
 Pitfall (1981)
 The Rovers (1969)
 SCTV (1976)
 Strike It Rich (1986)

See also 
 Fremantle
 All American Television
 Lexington Broadcast Services Company

References 

RTL Group
Former Bertelsmann subsidiaries
1975 establishments in New York City
1992 disestablishments in New York (state)
Companies based in New York City
Mass media companies established in 1975
Defunct mass media companies of the United States
Television syndication distributors
Mass media companies disestablished in 1992